NMML may refer to:
National Marine Mammal Laboratory, a United States research laboratory 
Nehru Memorial Museum &  Library in New Delhi